The Greater Manchester Labour Party mayoral selection of 2016 was the process by which the Labour Party selected its candidate for Mayor of Greater Manchester, to stand in the mayoral election on 4 May 2017. On 9 August 2016, The Labour Party announced that Andy Burnham had won the candidacy.

Timetable
3 June 2016: Short-list announced
26 July 2016: Hustings, held by The Manchester Evening News
9 August 2016: Results announced

Candidates

Result

Turnout was 65.3%, with 7,427 votes cast.

Endorsements
Andy Burnham
 Debbie Abrahams, Shadow Secretary of State for Work and Pensions (2016–2018), MP for Oldham East and Saddleworth (2011–present)
 Yvonne Fovargue, MP for Makerfield (2010–present)
 Andrew Gwynne, Shadow Health Minister (2011–present), MP for Denton and Reddish (2005–present)

Ivan Lewis
Alan Johnson, Former Labour Cabinet Minister (2004-2010), Chair of Labour IN for Britain (2016), MP for Kingston upon Hull West and Hessle (1997-present)
Stella Creasy,  MP for Walthamstow (2010–present)
Cllr Rishi Shori, Leader of Bury Council
Cllr Alex Ganotis, Leader of Stockport Metropolitan Borough Council
Sir Richard Leese, Leader of Manchester City Council

Tony Lloyd
Co-operative Party, UK centre-left political party closely affiliated to the Labour Party
 Theresa Griffin, MEP for North West England (2014–present)
 Afzal Khan, MEP for North West England (2014–present)
 Rebecca Long-Bailey, MP for Salford and Eccles (2015–present)
 Cllr Kieran Quin, Leader of Tameside Metropolitan Borough Council
 Yasmin Qureshi, MP for Bolton South East (2010–present)
 Angela Rayner, MP for Ashton-under-Lyne (2015–present)
 Unite the Union, largest trade union in the UK and Ireland

See also
 Liverpool City Region Labour Party mayoral selection, 2016
 London Labour Party mayoral selection, 2015

References

External links
North West Labour Party website

History of the Labour Party (UK)
2017 English local elections
Elections in Greater Manchester
2010s in Greater Manchester
Andy Burnham